Gaksan Station is a commuter train station on the Daegu Subway Line 1 in Sinseo-dong, Dong District, Daegu, South Korea.
There are many apartments surrounding the station. You can enter the Dongho residential area in order to get to Gumgang-dong.

References

External links 
 DTRO virtual station
 Gaksan Station Facebook

Dong District, Daegu
Daegu Metro stations
Railway stations opened in 1998